William H. "Dad" Clarke (January 7, 1865 – June 3, 1911) was an American professional baseball pitcher.

References
 "Dad Clarke Out for Good: Famous Old Pitcher Dies from Stroke of Paralysis", Omaha Daily Bee, June 5, 1911, page 10 (available on line through the Library of Congress' Chronicling America database).

External links

1865 births
1911 deaths
19th-century baseball players
Major League Baseball pitchers
Chicago White Stockings players
Columbus Solons players
New York Giants (NL) players
Louisville Colonels players
Des Moines Hawkeyes players
Sandusky Suds players
Sandusky Sands players
Sandusky Maroons players
Omaha Omahogs players
Omaha Lambs players
San Francisco Haverlys players
Toledo Black Pirates players
Erie Blackbirds players
Worcester Farmers players
Buffalo Bisons (minor league) players
Butte Smoke Eaters players
Spokane Blue Stockings players
Minneapolis Millers (baseball) players
Oskaloosa Quakers players
Calumet Aristocrats players
Baseball players from New York (state)
People from Oswego, New York